The 2003 Tour de Corse (formally the 47th Tour de Corse - Rallye de France) was the twelfth round of the 2003 World Rally Championship. The race was held over three days between 17 October and 19 October 2003, and was based in Ajaccio, France. Subaru's Petter Solberg won the race, his 4th win in the World Rally Championship.

Background

Entry list

Itinerary
All dates and times are CEST (UTC+2).

Results

Overall

World Rally Cars

Classification

Special stages

Championship standings

Production World Rally Championship

Classification

Special stages

Championship standings
Bold text indicates 2003 World Champions.

References

External links 
 Official website of the World Rally Championship

Tour de Corse
Tour de Corse
Tour de Corse